Baseball was one of the many sports which was held at the 1998 Asian Games in Bangkok, Thailand beginning on 7 December 1998.

Schedule

Medalists

Results

Preliminary round

Level A

Level B

Final round

Semifinals

Bronze medal game

Final

Final standing

References
Results

 
1998 Asian Games events
1998
Asian Games
1998 Asian Games